Treviskey is a hamlet in the parish of Veryan, in the county of Cornwall in south-west England.

References

Hamlets in Cornwall